Bodianus masudai is a species of wrasse. It is found in the Western Pacific Ocean.

Size

Etymology
The fish is named in honor of Hajime Masuda (1921–2005) of the University of Tokyo, who collected the type specimen and co-authored the study in which the fishes description appeared.

References

Fish of the Pacific Ocean
masudai
Taxa named by Chūichi Araga
Taxa named by Tetsuo Yoshino
Fish described in 1975